This list of shield volcanoes   includes active, dormant and extinct shield volcanoes. 
Shield Volcanoes are one of the three types of volcanoes. They have a short cone shape, and have basaltic lava which means the lava has low viscosity (viscosity is a measure of the ability for a liquid to flow)

Active

Canada
Lava plateau of the Mount Edziza volcanic complex (British Columbia, Canada)

Ecuador
 Alcedo Volcano, Galápagos Islands
 La Cumbre, Galápagos Islands
 Sierra Negra, Galápagos Islands
 Cerro Azul, Galápagos Islands
 Fernandina Island, Galápagos Islands

Other
 Barrier (Kenya)
 Bottom half of Mount Erebus (Ross Dependency, Antarctica)
 Erta Ale (Ethiopia)
 Bottom half of Mount Etna (Sicily, Italy)
 Mount Wrangell (Alaska)
 Mount Karthala (Comoros)
 Namarunu (Kenya)
 Niuafo'ou (Tonga)
 Mount Nyamuragira (Democratic Republic of the Congo)
 Piton de la Fournaise (Réunion, France)
 Masaya Volcano, Nicaragua
 Kīlauea, Hawaii, US
 Mauna Loa, Hawaii
 Mount Halla (Jeju Island, South Korea)
 Mascarin Peak (Marion Island,South Africa)

Dormant

Canada
Heart Peaks
Itcha Range (British Columbia, Canada)
Lava plateau of Level Mountain (British Columbia, Canada)

United States
Haleakalā (Maui)
Hell's Half Acre (Idaho)
Arlington Cone (Arizona)
House Mountain (Arizona)
Hualālai (Hawaii)
Indian Heaven (Washington)
Mauna Kea (Hawaii)
Medicine Lake Volcano (California)
Newberry Volcano (Oregon)
Shoshone Lava Field (Idaho)
The Three Sisters (Oregon)
Wapi Lava Field (Idaho)

Kenya
Mount Marsabit
Menengai

Other
La Grille (Comoros)
Queen Mary's Peak (South Atlantic Ocean)
Rangitoto Island (New Zealand)
Santorini (Greece)
São Tomé (São Tomé and Príncipe, Atlantic Ocean)
Skjaldbreiður (Iceland)
 Kollóttadyngja (Iceland)
 Trölladyngja (Iceland)
Mount Takahe (Marie Byrd Land, Antarctica)
Taveuni (Fiji)
Karaca Dağ (Turkey)

Extinct

Antarctica
Mount Andrus
Mount Berlin
Mount Moulton
Mount Sidley (Marie Byrd Land)
Mount Terror (Ross Dependency)

Other
Ball's Pyramid of Australia is a volcanic plug, or an erosional remnant of a shield volcano.
Banks Peninsula (Christchurch, New Zealand)
Bermuda Pedestal (Bermuda, United Kingdom)
Dunedin Volcano (Dunedin, New Zealand)
Kohala (Hawaii, United States)
Kookooligit Mountains (St. Lawrence Island, Alaska, United States)
Lord Howe Island, (Australia)
Piton des Neiges (Réunion, France)
Poike (Easter Island, Chile)
Rano Kau (Easter Island, Chile)
Slieve Gullion (Northern Ireland, United Kingdom)
 Tamu Massif (Shatsky Rise, Pacific Ocean)
Terevaka (Easter Island, Chile)
Topo Volcano, Azores, Portugal
Tweed Volcano, Australia
Mount Charter, Australia
Mount Tor, Australia
Mount Julia, Australia 
Mount Cripps, Australia 
Verkhovoy (Kamchatka Peninsula, Russia.)

Other planets and satellites

Mars & Venus
Alba Mons
Olympus Mons
Arsia Mons 
Ascraeus Mons
Pavonis Mons
Syrtis Major Planum
Maat Mons
Theia Mons

Io

Io, a moon of Jupiter, has several volcanoes that spew sulphur. Some of these include Pele and Tohil Mons.

Pyroclastic shields

Bolivia
 Sacabaya
 Tata Sabaya

Nicaragua
 Apoyeque
 Masaya

Papua New Guinea
 Rabaul, New Britain

Other

 Ambrym, Vanuatu
 Purico Complex, Chile

See also
List of stratovolcanoes
List of subglacial volcanoes
List of cinder cones
List of lava domes
Shield volcano

References

 Shield